Rock Against Bush, Vol. 1 is a Rock Against Bush compilation album released on the Fat Wreck Chords record label. It contains a collection of songs, both released and unreleased, by various punk rock artists and includes a bonus DVD with political facts, commentary regarding the U.S. presidential election, 2004, footage from a David Cross stand-up comedy performance, as well as a few music videos. It was released on 20 April 2004.

Track listing
 "Nothing to Do When You're Locked in a Vacancy" - None More Black  – 2:07 *
 "Moron" (Demo) - Sum 41  – 1:39 *
 "Warbrain" - Alkaline Trio  – 2:27 *
 "Need More Time" - Epoxies  – 2:29
 "The School of Assassins" - Anti-Flag  – 2:37 *
 "Sink, Florida, Sink" (Electric) - Against Me!  – 2:10 *
 "Baghdad" - The Offspring  – 3:18 *
 "Lion and the Lamb" - The Get Up Kids  – 3:22 *
 "Give It All" - Rise Against  – 2:49
 "No W" - Ministry  – 3:13 *
 "Sad State of Affairs" - Descendents  – 2:35 *
 "Revolution" - Authority Zero  – 2:23 *
 "¡Paranoia! Cha-Cha-Cha" - The Soviettes  – 2:04 *
 "That's Progress" - Jello Biafra with D.O.A.  – 3:14
 "Overcome (The Recapitulation)" - Rx Bandits  – 3:43
 "No Voice of Mine" - Strung Out  – 2:30 *
 "To the World" - Strike Anywhere  – 3:21
 "Heaven Is Falling" (Bad Religion Cover) - The Ataris  – 2:38 *
 "God Save the USA" - Pennywise  – 3:06
 "Normal Days" - Denali  – 3:25
 "The Expatriate Act" - The World/Inferno Friendship Society  – 3:02 *
 "No News Is Good News" - New Found Glory  – 2:58 *
 "Basket of Snakes" - The Frisk  – 2:31 *
 "Jaw, Knee, Music" - NOFX  – 2:31 *
 "It's the Law" - Social Distortion  – 2:35
 "The Brightest Bulb Has Burned Out" - Less Than Jake featuring Billy Bragg  – 4:52*

* previously unreleased/rare tracks

Original appearances
The previously released tracks are listed below with the albums on which they originally appeared: 
"Need More Time" - track 1 on Epoxies' self-titled album 
"That's Progress" - track 1 on Jello Biafra and D.O.A.'s Last Scream of the Missing Neighbors collaboration
"Overcome (The Recapitulation)" - track 4 on Rx Bandits' The Resignation
"To the World" - track 4 on Strike Anywhere's Exit English
"God Save the USA" - track 2 on Pennywise's From the Ashes
"Normal Days" - track 8 on Denali's The Instinct
"It's the Law" - track 1 on Social Distortion's Prison Bound
"Revolution" - track 2 on Authority Zero's Andiamo
"Baghdad" - track 3 on The Offspring's Baghdad
"Give It All" - track 9 on Siren Song of the Counter Culture (Although a different version appears on the album)
"The Brightest Bulb Has Burned Out" - track 13 on Anthem from Less than Jake minus Bragg

See also
 Fat Wreck Chords compilations
 Rock Against Bush, Vol. 2

References

Fat Wreck Chords compilation albums
2004 compilation albums